The Rainy River is a river of the southern Tasman Region of New Zealand's South Island. The Motupiko River is a tributary of the Motueka River.

References

Rivers of the Tasman District
Rivers of New Zealand